Akatsi South District is one of eighteen districts in Volta Region, Ghana. Originally it was formerly part of the then-larger Akatsi District on 10 March 1989, which was created from the former Anlo District Council, until the northern part of the district was split off to create Akatsi North District on 28 June 2012; under the government by then-president John Atta Mills. thus the remaining part has been renamed as Akatsi South District. The district assembly is located in the southeast part of Volta Region and has Akatsi as its capital town. Some areas in the district are Twime, Tatorme, Atidigakope, Esianyokope, Hudekope and Agbaflome.

References 

Districts of Volta Region
States and territories established in 2012